The 2014 World's Strongest Man was the 37th edition of World's Strongest Man. The event was held at the Commerce Casino in Los Angeles, California, the same host city as the 2012 World's Strongest Man contest. The qualifying heats were held from March 22–25 and the finals on March 28 & 29. Unlike previous years when 10 athletes qualified for the finals, this year there were 12 qualifying spots. The top 2 from each heat qualified, as well as the 2 highest scoring 3rd place athletes from all 5 heats. The event was sponsored by the Commerce Casino and will begin broadcasting in the United States on the CBS Sports Network from July 4-August 13, 2014. Zydrunas Savickas from Lithuania finished in first place, this was his fourth WSM title. Hafþór Júlíus Björnsson from Iceland finished in second place, and Brian Shaw from the United States came in third.

Line-up

Qualified athletes

Heat Results

Heat 1

Heat 2

Heat 3

Heat 4

Heat 5

Final standings

References

External links
 Official site

World's Strongest Man
World's Strongest Man
World's Strongest Man
World's Strongest Man